Jung Jae-sung (also spelled Chung Jae-sung; Hangul: 정재성; Hanja: 鄭在成; ; 25 August 1982 – 9 March 2018) was a South Korean professional badminton player.

Jung was born on 25 August 1982 in Jeonju, Jeollabuk-do. He started playing badminton at 7, at his local elementary school. He entered the South Korea national badminton team in 2001.

Career 
In 2000, Jung was part of the Korean national junior team competed at the World Junior Championships in Guangzhou, China, and Asian Junior Championships in Kyoto, Japan. In Guangzhou, he won the mixed team bronze after his team lost 2–3 to China, and in Kyoto, he won the boys' doubles silver and boys' team bronze.

In 2003, Jung, who represented Wonkwang University, won the men's doubles title at the National Championships in Gyeonggi partnered with Lee Jae-jin. In 2004, he and Lee Jae-jin retained their title, and in 2006, Jung repeated his success partnered with Lee Yong-dae.

In 2005, Jung won the Thailand Open with his former partner Lee Jae-jin, beating the Danes Lars Paaske and Jonas Rasmussen in the finals. In 2006, Jung won the Thailand Open together with Lee Yong-dae; they had a walkover in the final against compatriots Lee Jae-jin, with whom Jung won the last Thailand Open, and Hwang Ji-man. At the Asian Games, Jung and Lee became bronze medalists after losing the semi-finals to Luluk Hadiyanto and Alvent Yulianto of Indonesia in the individual men's doubles event. In the team event, South Korea lost to China in the final 2–3, thus gaining Jung a silver medal.

In 2007, Jung and Lee Yong-dae participated in the Malaysia Open, the first ever BWF Super Series event. There they got through the first round but had to resign due to injury. However a week later they blew away competition to take the first prize at the Korea Open. Jung and Lee lost to Lee Jae-jin and Hwang Ji-man in the final of the German Open. Jung participated to the 2007 Sudirman Cup with the South Korea team. The team lost to China in the semi-finals with a score of 0–3. In July, after a period of disappointing results in men's doubles, Lee became runner-up with Jung at the Thailand Open, losing to Lee Jae-jin and Hwang Ji-man. Not much later, the pair went on to take the silver medal in the 2007 BWF World Championships. They were defeated in the final by Markis Kido and Hendra Setiawan of Indonesia, 19–21, 19–21. The rest of the year also resulted in quite disappointing achievements, not getting past quarterfinals in any major events, except in the French Open. Jung and Lee there lost to the eventual winners, Cai Yun and Fu Haifeng of China.

To start 2008, Jung, together with Lee, disappointingly lost to an unseeded pair in the second round of the Malaysia Open. In South Korea, things went a bit better, achieving a quarterfinal. There they lost to runners-up Luluk Hadiyanto and Alvent Yulianto of Indonesia. More than a month later, Jung and Lee came back with a bang to win the All England Open, beating Choong Tan Fook and Lee Wan Wah in a thrilling semi-final (coming back from a 16–20 deficit in the third game) and compatriots Lee Jae-jin and Hwang Ji-man in the finals. A week later, the pair were victorious in the Swiss Open too. At the Asian Championships Jung and Lee gained the gold medal, beating Candra Wijaya and Nova Widianto of Indonesia in the final. He competed at the Thomas Cup, helped his team reach the final round, where Jung and Lee were the only ones to score a point for South Korea against China in the final, which ended in a 3–1 win for China. In November, Jung also won the 2008 China Open Super Series.

2008 Olympic Games 
Not having participated in the two following Superseries events, supposedly because of their preparations for the Summer Olympics, Jung and Lee were disappointingly knocked out in the first round in Beijing. His partner went on to get the gold medal in mixed doubles.

2012 Olympic Games 
At the London Olympics, Jung, together with Lee, won the men's doubles bronze medal. The pair who were seeded two, advanced to the knock-out stage after placing first, won three matches in group D stage. They lost the match in the semi-final match against Mathias Boe and Carsten Mogensen of Denmark, and in the bronze medal match, they beat the Malaysian pair Koo Kien Keat and Tan Boon Heong in straight games. That was Jung's final tournament.

Death 
On 9 March 2018, Jung died of a heart attack at the age of 35.

Achievements

Olympic Games 
Men's doubles

BWF World Championships 
Men's doubles

Asian Games 
Men's doubles

Asian Championships 
Men's doubles

Asian Junior Championships 
Boys' doubles

BWF Superseries 
The BWF Superseries, launched on 14 December 2006 and implemented in 2007, is a series of elite badminton tournaments, sanctioned by Badminton World Federation (BWF). BWF Superseries has two level such as Superseries and Superseries Premier. A season of Superseries features twelve tournaments around the world, which introduced since 2011, with successful players invited to the Superseries Finals held at the year end.

Men's doubles

  BWF Superseries Finals tournament
  BWF Superseries Premier tournament
  BWF Superseries tournament

BWF Grand Prix 
The BWF Grand Prix has two levels, the BWF Grand Prix and Grand Prix Gold. It is a series of badminton tournaments sanctioned by the Badminton World Federation (BWF) since 2007. The World Badminton Grand Prix has been sanctioned by the International Badminton Federation since 1983.

Men's doubles

  BWF Grand Prix Gold tournament
  BWF & IBF Grand Prix tournament

BWF International Challenge/Series/Satellite 
Men's doubles

  BWF International Challenge tournament
  BWF International Series tournament

References

External links 

 Badzine Player's Database
 
 

1982 births
2018 deaths
People from Jeonju
South Korean male badminton players
Badminton players at the 2008 Summer Olympics
Badminton players at the 2012 Summer Olympics
Olympic badminton players of South Korea
Olympic bronze medalists for South Korea
Olympic medalists in badminton
Medalists at the 2012 Summer Olympics
Badminton players at the 2006 Asian Games
Badminton players at the 2010 Asian Games
Asian Games silver medalists for South Korea
Asian Games bronze medalists for South Korea
Asian Games medalists in badminton
Medalists at the 2006 Asian Games
Medalists at the 2010 Asian Games
World No. 1 badminton players
Sportspeople from North Jeolla Province